Roderick Perry II (born December 3, 1997) is an American football defensive tackle for the Cleveland Browns of the National Football League (NFL). He played college football at South Carolina State and Illinois.

Professional career
After going undrafted in the 2022 NFL draft, Perry was signed by the Cleveland Browns on May 1, 2022. He was promoted to the active roster on November 12, 2022. He was waived on November 14 and re-signed to the practice squad. He signed a reserve/future contract on January 9, 2023.

References

1997 births
Living people
American football defensive tackles
Cleveland Browns players
Illinois Fighting Illini football players